The following towns exist in the Adelaide Hills and foothills. (major towns are shown in bold):

Places of Significance 
 Kuitpo Forest
 Heysen Trail
 South Eastern Freeway

Lists of towns in Australia
South Australia-related lists